Pearl of Love is a 1925 American silent drama film directed by Leon Danmun and starring Betty Balfour, Gladys Leslie, and Burr McIntosh. It is based upon a novel by Harriet Beecher Stowe.

Plot
As described in a film magazine review, little Mara finds a boy and his mother lashed to a raft. Mara's grandfather adopts the boy, who later grows up and comes to love Mara and becomes a shipbuilder. When he turns to smuggling, he later is converted by his love of Mara to go straight.

Cast

Preservation
With no prints of Pearl of Love located in any film archives, it is a lost film.

References

Bibliography
 Ken Wlaschin. The Silent Cinema in Song, 1896-1929: An Illustrated History and Catalog of Songs Inspired by the Movies and Stars, with a List of Recordings. McFarland & Company, 2009.

External links

1925 films
American silent feature films
American black-and-white films
Films based on works by Harriet Beecher Stowe
1920s English-language films
1920s American films